Issus may refer to:

 Issus (Cilicia), an ancient settlement in the modern Turkish province of Hatay
 Battle of Issus, in 333 BC, in which Alexander the Great defeated Darius III
 Issus (river), a river near the town and battle site
 Issus (diocese), a Roman Catholic titular see in the town
 Gulf of Issus, near the town
 Issus, Haute-Garonne, a commune in France
 Issus (planthopper), a genus of planthoppers in the family Issidae
 Issus, the ostensible Goddess of Death and Eternal Life in the Barsoom series of novels

See also
Isus (disambiguation)